Barcinidae is a family of cnidarians belonging to the order Leptomedusae. The family consists of only one genus: Barcino Gili, Bouillon, Pages, Palanques & Puig, 1999.

References

Leptothecata
Cnidarian families